TV Kiss was a Bosnia and Herzegovina local commercial television channel based in Kiseljak, Bosnia and Herzegovina.
The program is mainly produced in Croatian. The TV station was established in 1992 and become a part of Radiotelevizija Herceg-Bosne in 2019.

References

External links 
 Communications Regulatory Agency of Bosnia and Herzegovina

Defunct television channels in Bosnia and Herzegovina